Underworld is an adult-themed comic strip written and drawn by the artist Kaz since 1992. It runs in many American alternative weeklies such as the New York Press and the SF Bay Guardian. It features regular characters such as Smoking Cat, Sam Snuff, Creep Rat, Nuzzle, Petit Mort, and others, interacting within an archetypal inner-city environment. The strip's humor is often abstract, with observations such as that God's favorite form of life is the doofus.

Six book collections of Underworld strips have been published by Fantagraphics Books:
 Underworld: Cruel and Unusual Comics
 Bare Bulbs: Underworld Two
 Ink Punk: Underworld Three
 Duh: Underworld 4
 Underworld 5: My Little Funny
 Underworld: From Hoboken to Hollywood - omnibus collection.

See also
 Official site

American comic strips
1992 comics debuts
Underground comix